John Ormsby Vandeleur (17 April 1767 – 3 November 1822) was an Irish politician.  He sat in the Irish House of Commons as a Member of Parliament (MP) for Granard from 1790 to 1798.

References 

1767 births
1822 deaths
Members of the Parliament of Ireland (pre-1801) for County Longford constituencies
Irish MPs 1790–1797
5th Dragoon Guards officers